Idukki Diocese is a diocese of the Malankara Orthodox Syrian Church. The diocese was formed in 1982 with the parishes in Idukki district in Kerala. Zachariah Mar Severios is the Metropolitan of Idukki Diocese.

History
Idukki Diocese was formed in 1982. This diocese was formed by the partition of Kottayam Diocese in 1982. The first metropolitan of Idukki Diocese was Mathews Mar Barnabas. He bought the land at Chakkupallam and constructed the bishop's house named Gathesemon Aramana.

Geography
The parishes in the diocese scattered across large geographical area. Located in the hilly forest area, the distance among the parishes are quite far from each other.

Diocesan Metropolitans
 Mathews Barnabas.
 Mathews Severios (Later Baselios Marthoma Mathews III)
 Paulose Mar Pachomios
 Abraham Severios
 Augen Mar Dionysios
 Paulose Milithios
 Mathews Theodosius
 Baselios Marthoma Mathews III
 Joshua Nicodimos
 Zachariah Severios

List of Parishes

Cathedral
 St. Thomas Orthodox Cathedral, Kungiripetty

Other Parishes
 Tabor St. George Orthodox Valiyapally, Nettithozhu
 St. George Orthodox Valiyapalli, Thekkady
 St. Stephen's Orthodox Church, Alampally
 St. Thomas Orthodox Church, Anavilasam
 St. Mary's Orthodox Church, Ayyappancovil
 St. Gregorios Orthodox Church, Chellar Kovil
 Mar Gregorios Orthodox Church, Chettukuzhy
 St. Mary's Orthodox Church, Cumbumettu
 St. Mary's Orthodox Church, Elappara
 St. Thomas Orthodox Church, Helibria
 St. Thomas Orthodox Church, Kanjikuzhy
 St. George Orthodox Church, Karimpan
 Jerusalem St. Thomas Orthodox Church, Karunapuram
 St. Mary's Orthodox Church, Kattapana
 St. Mary's Orthodox Church, Kochera
 St. Mary's Orthodox Church, Mundiyeruma
 St. Mary's Orthodox Church, Nariyampara
 St. Mary's Orthodox Church, Nedumkandam
 St. George Orthodox Church, Pallikunnu
 Mar Gregorios Orthodox Church, Pampanar
 St. Thomas Orthodox Church, Peermade
 St. Mary's Orthodox Church, Puliyanmala
 St. Peter's Orthodox Church, Pullikkanam
 St. Mary's Orthodox Church, Puttady
 St. Mary's Orthodox Church, Santigram
 Mar Gregorios Orthodox Church, Thankamony
 St. George Orthodox Church, Thengakallu
 St. Mary's Orthodox Church, Uppukunnu
 St. Thomas Orthodox Church, Upputhara
 St. Mary's Orthodox Church, Valiyathovala
 St. Thomas Orthodox Church, Vandenmedu
 St. Mary's Orthodox Church, Vandiperiyar
 St. Mary's Orthodox Church, Vazhavara
 St. Diyanosyious Orthodox Church, kodukuthy
 St. Diyanosyious Orthodox Church, Pampadumpara

Pilgrim Centers
 Carmel Mar Gregoriose Pilgrim Center, Puttady

Notes

External links
 Idukki Diocese - mosc.in 

Malankara Orthodox Syrian Church dioceses
1982 establishments in Kerala